Matías Alasia (born 7 May 1985) was an Argentine footballer.

Career
Alasia is best known for his heroics in saving two penalties during Gimnasia y Esgrima de Mendoza's 2014 Torneo Federal A promotion playoff victory over Talleres de Córdoba.

He played for Coquimbo Unido, then member Primera B de Chile (second-tier).

References

External links
 Profile at BDFA
 

1985 births
Living people
Argentine expatriate footballers
Argentine footballers
Arsenal de Sarandí footballers
Tiro Federal footballers
Coquimbo Unido footballers
Expatriate footballers in Chile
Club Cipolletti footballers
Gimnasia y Esgrima de Mendoza footballers
Association football goalkeepers
Sportspeople from Córdoba Province, Argentina